A number of ships have been named Laconia

, a Cunard ocean liner torpedoed and sunk on 25 February 1917
, a Cunard ocean liner torpedoed and sunk on 12 September 1942
, a Greek cargo ship in service 1948–65

See also
, a Greek ocean liner burnt out and sunk in December 1965

Ship names